Cover Me may refer to:

Music

Albums
 Cover Me (Nena album), 2007
 Cover Me (compilation album), a 1989 album by various artists covering Bruce Springsteen hits
 Cover Me, 3-track EP by Tom McRae

Songs
 "Cover Me" (Bruce Springsteen song), by Bruce Springsteen from his 1984 album Born in the U.S.A.
 "Cover Me" (Depeche Mode song), 2017 song from Spirit
 "Cover Me", by Björk from her 1995 album Post
 "Cover Me", by Candlebox from their 1993 eponymous debut album
 "Cover Me", by Michael W. Smith from his 2006 album Stand
 "Cover Me", by Percy Sledge from his album 1968 Take Time to Know Her

Film and television
 Cover Me Canada, a Canadian music reality show
 Cover Me (film), a 1995 American thriller
 Cover Me (American TV series), American crime comedy-drama series
 Cover Me (Canadian TV series), a Canadian TV series